Conor Harrity (born September 3, 1994) is an American rower. He competed in the men's eight event at the 2020 Summer Olympics.

References

External links
 
 Harvard Crimson bio
 

1994 births
Living people
American male rowers
Olympic rowers of the United States
Rowers at the 2020 Summer Olympics
Rowers from Boston
Harvard Crimson rowers